Meet Fresh is a Taiwanese dessert restaurant chain, with locations in Asia, Australia, New Zealand, UK, Canada and the United States. Corporate headquarters are in New Taipei City.

Founded in 2007, the chain specializes in fresh Taiwanese desserts, including soft taro balls and herbed jelly.

See also
 List of companies of Taiwan

References

External links

Restaurant chains
Restaurant chains in Taiwan
Restaurants established in 2007
2007 establishments in Taiwan
Companies based in New Taipei
Asian restaurants

Location